Alsóvadász is a village in Borsod-Abaúj-Zemplén county, Hungary.

At the end of the 19th century and the beginning of the 20th century, Jews lived in the village. In 1840, 149 Jews lived in the village and there was a Jewish cemetery there. Some of them were murdered in the Holocaust.

References

External links 
 Street map 

Populated places in Borsod-Abaúj-Zemplén County
Jewish communities destroyed in the Holocaust